Argentina is a country in South America.

Argentina may also refer to:

Places
 Argentina, Santiago del Estero, Argentina, a village
 Strasbourg or Argentina, a city and prince-bishopric in France
 Argentina (river), a river in Imperia Province, Italy
 Villa Argentina, a seaside resort in Uruguay

Music
 Argentina, a 1996 album by Thela
 "Argentina", a song by Gunna from Wunna
 "Argentina", a song by Trueno featuring Nathy Peluso

Other uses
 Argentina (plant), a genus of flowering plants
 Argentina (fish), a genus of fishes
 Argentina (brand), a Philippine brand of meat products
 República Argentina (Madrid Metro), a station on Line 6
 Argentina, a variant of the Ligurian dialect Brigasc
 Callsign for Aerolíneas Argentinas, a leisure airline

People with the name
 Imperio Argentina (1906–2003), Argentine singer and actress
 Argentina Brunetti (1907–2005), Argentine actress and writer

See also 
 Argentia, Newfoundland, Canada
Argennina, a genus of spiders
 La Argentina (disambiguation)
 Argentine (disambiguation)
 Argentinia (fly), a genus of flies
 La Argentinita or Encarnación López Julvez (1898–1945), Argentine flamenco dancer
 Largo di Torre Argentina, a piazza in Rome
 Name of Argentina

Genus disambiguation pages